Ava Marie Ziegler (born February 28, 2006) is an American figure skater. She is the 2022 CS Budapest Trophy champion.

Personal life 
Ziegler was born on February 28, 2006, in Morristown, New Jersey, to parents Ron and Patricia, a former competitive figure skater. She has a younger brother, Ronny. A resident of Dover, New Jersey, Ziegler homeschools through Bridgeway Academy.

Programs

Competitive highlights 
GP: Grand Prix; CS: Challenger Series; JGP: Junior Grand Prix.

Senior level 
ISU Personal best highlighted in bold.

Junior level 
ISU Personal best (junior) highlighted in bold.

References

External links 
 

2006 births
Living people
American female single skaters
People from Dover, New Jersey
People from Morristown, New Jersey
Sportspeople from Morris County, New Jersey
21st-century American women